Taggarse is a locality in Byndoor city, Karnataka, India.It is a part of Byndoor Town Panchayat. It is located in the Byndoor taluk of Udupi district in Karnataka.

Demographics
As of 2001 India census, Taggarse had a population of 6243 with 2893 males and 3350 females.

See also
 Byndoor
 Yedthare
 Paduvari
 Udupi

References

External links
 http://Udupi.nic.in/

Cities and towns in Udupi district